A lattice is an abstract structure studied in the mathematical subdisciplines of order theory and abstract algebra. It consists of a partially ordered set in which every pair of elements has a unique supremum (also called a least upper bound or join) and a unique infimum (also called a greatest lower bound or meet). An example is given by the power set of a set, partially ordered by inclusion, for which the supremum is the union and the infimum is the intersection. Another example is given by the natural numbers, partially ordered by divisibility, for which the supremum is the least common multiple and the infimum is the greatest common divisor.

Lattices can also be characterized as algebraic structures satisfying certain axiomatic identities. Since the two definitions are equivalent, lattice theory draws on both order theory and universal algebra. Semilattices include lattices, which in turn include Heyting and Boolean algebras. These lattice-like structures all admit order-theoretic as well as algebraic descriptions.

The sub-field of abstract algebra that studies lattices is called lattice theory.

Definition 

A lattice can be defined either order-theoretically as a partially ordered set, or as an algebraic structure.

As partially ordered set 
A partially ordered set (poset)  is called a lattice if it is both a join- and a meet-semilattice, i.e. each two-element subset  has a join (i.e. least upper bound, denoted by ) and dually a meet (i.e. greatest lower bound, denoted by ). This definition makes  and  binary operations. Both operations are monotone with respect to the given order:  and  implies that  and 

It follows by an induction argument that every non-empty finite subset of a lattice has a least upper bound and a greatest lower bound. With additional assumptions, further conclusions may be possible; see Completeness (order theory) for more discussion of this subject. That article also discusses how one may rephrase the above definition in terms of the existence of suitable Galois connections between related partially ordered sets—an approach of special interest for the category theoretic approach to lattices, and for formal concept analysis.

In addition to this extrinsic definition as a subset of some other algebraic structure (a lattice), a partial lattice can also be intrinsically defined as a set with two partial binary operations satisfying certain axioms.

As algebraic structure 

The following two identities are also usually regarded as axioms, even though they follow from the two absorption laws taken together. These are called .

The absorption laws, the only axioms above in which both meet and join appear, distinguish a lattice from an arbitrary pair of semilattice structures and assure that the two semilattices interact appropriately. In particular, each semilattice is the dual of the other. The absorption laws can be viewed as a requirement that the meet and join semilattices define the same partial order.

Connection between the two definitions 

An order-theoretic lattice gives rise to the two binary operations  and  Since the commutative, associative and absorption laws can easily be verified for these operations, they make  into a lattice in the algebraic sense.

The converse is also true.

for all elements  The laws of absorption ensure that both definitions are equivalent:

and dually for the other direction.

One can now check that the relation ≤ introduced in this way defines a partial ordering within which binary meets and joins are given through the original operations  and 

Since the two definitions of a lattice are equivalent, one may freely invoke aspects of either definition in any way that suits the purpose at hand.

Bounded lattice

A partially ordered set is a bounded lattice if and only if every finite set of elements (including the empty set) has a join and a meet. For every element  of a poset it is vacuously true that
 and
 and therefore every element of a poset is both an upper bound and a lower bound of the empty set.  This implies that the join of an empty set is the least element  and the meet of the empty set is the greatest element  This is consistent with the associativity and commutativity of meet and join: the join of a union of finite sets is equal to the join of the joins of the sets, and dually, the meet of a union of finite sets is equal to the meet of the meets of the sets, that is, for finite subsets  of a poset 

and

hold. Taking B to be the empty set,

and

which is consistent with the fact that 

Every lattice can be embedded into a bounded lattice by adding a greatest and a least element.

Connection to other algebraic structures
Lattices have some connections to the family of group-like algebraic structures. Because meet and join both commute and associate, a lattice can be viewed as consisting of two commutative semigroups having the same domain. For a bounded lattice, these semigroups are in fact commutative monoids. The absorption law is the only defining identity that is peculiar to lattice theory.

By commutativity, associativity and idempotence one can think of join and meet as operations on non-empty finite sets, rather than on pairs of elements. This makes bounded lattices somewhat more natural than general lattices, and many authors require all lattices to be bounded.

The algebraic interpretation of lattices plays an essential role in universal algebra.

Examples 

In this lattice, the supremum is provided by set union and the infimum is provided by set intersection (see Pic. 1).
 For any set  the collection of all finite subsets of  ordered by inclusion, is also a lattice, and will be bounded if and only if  is finite.
 For any set  the collection of all partitions of  ordered by refinement, is a lattice (see Pic. 3).
 The positive integers in their usual order form an unbounded lattice, under the operations of "min" and "max". 1 is bottom; there is no top (see Pic. 4).
 The Cartesian square of the natural numbers, ordered so that  if  The pair  is the bottom element; there is no top (see Pic. 5).
 The natural numbers also form a lattice under the operations of taking the greatest common divisor and least common multiple, with divisibility as the order relation:  if  divides   is bottom;  is top. Pic. 2 shows a finite sublattice.
 Every complete lattice (also see below) is a (rather specific) bounded lattice. This class gives rise to a broad range of practical examples.
 The set of compact elements of an arithmetic complete lattice is a lattice with a least element, where the lattice operations are given by restricting the respective operations of the arithmetic lattice. This is the specific property that distinguishes arithmetic lattices from algebraic lattices, for which the compacts only form a join-semilattice. Both of these classes of complete lattices are studied in domain theory.

Further examples of lattices are given for each of the additional properties discussed below.

Examples of non-lattices

Most partially ordered sets are not lattices, including the following.

 A discrete poset, meaning a poset such that  implies  is a lattice if and only if it has at most one element.  In particular the two-element discrete poset is not a lattice.
 Although the set  partially ordered by divisibility is a lattice, the set  so ordered is not a lattice because the pair 2, 3 lacks a join; similarly, 2, 3 lacks a meet in 
 The set  partially ordered by divisibility is not a lattice.  Every pair of elements has an upper bound and a lower bound, but the pair 2, 3 has three upper bounds, namely 12, 18, and 36, none of which is the least of those three under divisibility (12 and 18 do not divide each other).  Likewise the pair 12, 18 has three lower bounds, namely 1, 2, and 3, none of which is the greatest of those three under divisibility (2 and 3 do not divide each other).

Morphisms of lattices 

The appropriate notion of a morphism between two lattices flows easily from the above algebraic definition. Given two lattices  and  a lattice homomorphism from L to M is a function  such that for all 

Thus  is a homomorphism of the two underlying semilattices. When lattices with more structure are considered, the morphisms should "respect" the extra structure, too. In particular, a bounded-lattice homomorphism (usually called just "lattice homomorphism")  between two bounded lattices  and  should also have the following property:

In the order-theoretic formulation, these conditions just state that a homomorphism of lattices is a function preserving binary meets and joins. For bounded lattices, preservation of least and greatest elements is just preservation of join and meet of the empty set.

Any homomorphism of lattices is necessarily monotone with respect to the associated ordering relation; see Limit preserving function. The converse is not true: monotonicity by no means implies the required preservation of meets and joins (see Pic. 9), although an order-preserving bijection is a homomorphism if its inverse is also order-preserving.

Lattices and their homomorphisms form a category.

Let  and  be two lattices with 0 and 1.

Sublattices 

Properties of lattices 

We now introduce a number of important properties that lead to interesting special classes of lattices. One, boundedness, has already been discussed.

Completeness 

A poset is called a  if  its subsets have both a join and a meet. In particular, every complete lattice is a bounded lattice. While bounded lattice homomorphisms in general preserve only finite joins and meets, complete lattice homomorphisms are required to preserve arbitrary joins and meets.

Every poset that is a complete semilattice is also a complete lattice. Related to this result is the interesting phenomenon that there are various competing notions of homomorphism for this class of posets, depending on whether they are seen as complete lattices, complete join-semilattices, complete meet-semilattices, or as join-complete or meet-complete lattices.

Note that "partial lattice" is not the opposite of "complete lattice" – rather, "partial lattice", "lattice", and "complete lattice" are increasingly restrictive definitions.

Conditional completeness 

A conditionally complete lattice is a lattice in which every  subset  has a join (that is, a least upper bound).  Such lattices provide the most direct generalization of the completeness axiom of the real numbers.  A conditionally complete lattice is either a complete lattice, or a complete lattice without its maximum element  its minimum element  or both.

Distributivity 

Since lattices come with two binary operations, it is natural to ask whether one of them distributes over the other, that is, whether one or the other of the following dual laws holds for every three elements :

A lattice that satisfies the first or, equivalently (as it turns out), the second axiom, is called a distributive lattice.
The only non-distributive lattices with fewer than 6 elements are called M3 and N5; they are shown in Pictures 10 and 11, respectively. A lattice is distributive if and only if it doesn't have a sublattice isomorphic to M3 or N5. Each distributive lattice is isomorphic to a lattice of sets (with union and intersection as join and meet, respectively).

For an overview of stronger notions of distributivity that are appropriate for complete lattices and that are used to define more special classes of lattices such as frames and completely distributive lattices, see distributivity in order theory.

Modularity 

For some applications the distributivity condition is too strong, and the following weaker property is often useful. A lattice  is  if, for all elements  the following identity holds:

This condition is equivalent to the following axiom:
 implies 
A lattice is modular if and only if it doesn't have a sublattice isomorphic to N5 (shown in Pic. 11).
Besides distributive lattices, examples of modular lattices are the lattice of two-sided ideals of a ring, the lattice of submodules of a module, and the lattice of normal subgroups of a group. The set of first-order terms with the ordering "is more specific than" is a non-modular lattice used in automated reasoning.

Semimodularity

A finite lattice is modular if and only if it is both upper and lower semimodular. For a graded lattice, (upper) semimodularity is equivalent to the following condition on the rank function 
 
Another equivalent (for graded lattices) condition is Birkhoff's condition:

A lattice is called lower semimodular if its dual is semimodular.

Continuity and algebraicity 

In domain theory, it is natural to seek to approximate the elements in a partial order by "much simpler" elements. This leads to the class of continuous posets, consisting of posets where every element can be obtained as the supremum of a directed set of elements that are way-below the element. If one can additionally restrict these to the compact elements of a poset for obtaining these directed sets, then the poset is even algebraic. Both concepts can be applied to lattices as follows:

 A continuous lattice is a complete lattice that is continuous as a poset.
 An algebraic lattice is a complete lattice that is algebraic as a poset.

Both of these classes have interesting properties. For example, continuous lattices can be characterized as algebraic structures (with infinitary operations) satisfying certain identities. While such a characterization is not known for algebraic lattices, they can be described "syntactically" via Scott information systems.

Complements and pseudo-complements 

Let  be a bounded lattice with greatest element 1 and least element 0.

In general, some elements of a bounded lattice might not have a complement, and others might have more than one complement. For example, the set  with its usual ordering is a bounded lattice, and  does not have a complement. A bounded lattice for which every element has a complement is called a complemented lattice.

A complemented lattice that is also distributive is a Boolean algebra. For a distributive lattice, the complement of  when it exists, is unique.

In the case the complement is unique, we write  and equivalently, . The corresponding unary operation over  called complementation, introduces an analogue of logical negation into lattice theory.

Heyting algebras are an example of distributive lattices where some members might be lacking complements. Every element  of a Heyting algebra has, on the other hand, a pseudo-complement, also denoted ¬x. The pseudo-complement is the greatest element  such that  If the pseudo-complement of every element of a Heyting algebra is in fact a complement, then the Heyting algebra is in fact a Boolean algebra.

Jordan–Dedekind chain condition 
The length of this chain is n, or one less than its number of elements.

Graded/ranked 

A lattice  is called graded, sometimes ranked (but see Ranked poset for an alternative meaning), if it can be equipped with a rank function  sometimes to ℤ, compatible with the ordering (so  whenever ) such that whenever  covers  then   The value of the rank function for a lattice element is called its rank.

A lattice element  is said to cover another element  if  but there does not exist a  such that 
Here,  means  and

Free lattices 

The free semilattice has the universal property. For the free lattice over a set  Whitman gave a construction based on polynomials over s members.

Important lattice-theoretic notions 
We now define some order-theoretic notions of importance to lattice theory. In the following, let  be an element of some lattice  If  has a bottom element   is sometimes required.  is called:
Join irreducible if  implies  for all  When the first condition is generalized to arbitrary joins   is called completely join irreducible (or -irreducible). The dual notion is meet irreducibility (-irreducible). For example, in Pic. 2, the elements 2, 3, 4, and 5 are join irreducible, while 12, 15, 20, and 30 are meet irreducible. In the lattice of real numbers with the usual order, each element is join irreducible, but none is completely join irreducible.
Join prime if  implies  This too can be generalized to obtain the notion completely join prime. The dual notion is meet prime. Every join-prime element is also join irreducible, and every meet-prime element is also meet irreducible. The converse holds if  is distributive.

Let  have a bottom element 0.
 Atomic if for every nonzero element  of  there exists an atom  of  such that 

However, many sources and mathematical communities use the term "atomic" to mean "atomistic" as defined above.

The notions of ideals and the dual notion of filters refer to particular kinds of subsets of a partially ordered set, and are therefore important for lattice theory. Details can be found in the respective entries.

See also 

 
 
 
 
  and filter (dual notions)
  (generalization to non-commutative join and meet)

Applications that use lattice theory

Note that in many applications the sets are only partial lattices: not every pair of elements has a meet or join.
Pointless topology
Lattice of subgroups
Spectral space
Invariant subspace
Closure operator
Abstract interpretation
Subsumption lattice
Fuzzy set theory
Algebraizations of first-order logic
Semantics of programming languages
Domain theory
Ontology (computer science)
Multiple inheritance
Formal concept analysis and Lattice Miner (theory and tool)
Bloom filter
Information flow
Ordinal optimization
Quantum logic
Median graph
Knowledge space
Regular language learning
Analogical modeling

Notes

References 

Monographs available free online:
 Burris, Stanley N., and Sankappanavar, H. P., 1981. A Course in Universal Algebra.  Springer-Verlag. .
 Jipsen, Peter, and Henry Rose, Varieties of Lattices, Lecture Notes in Mathematics 1533, Springer Verlag, 1992. .

Elementary texts recommended for those with limited mathematical maturity:
Donnellan, Thomas, 1968. Lattice Theory. Pergamon.
Grätzer, George, 1971. Lattice Theory: First concepts and distributive lattices. W. H. Freeman.

The standard contemporary introductory text, somewhat harder than the above:
 

Advanced monographs:
 Garrett Birkhoff, 1967. Lattice Theory, 3rd ed. Vol. 25 of AMS Colloquium Publications. American Mathematical Society.
Robert P. Dilworth and Crawley, Peter, 1973. Algebraic Theory of Lattices. Prentice-Hall. .

On free lattices:
 R. Freese, J. Jezek, and J. B. Nation, 1985. "Free Lattices". Mathematical Surveys and Monographs Vol. 42. Mathematical Association of America.
 Johnstone, P. T., 1982. Stone spaces. Cambridge Studies in Advanced Mathematics 3. Cambridge University Press.

On the history of lattice theory:
 
  Textbook with numerous attributions in the footnotes.
  Summary of the history of lattices.
 

On applications of lattice theory:
  Table of contents

External links
 
 
 J.B. Nation, Notes on Lattice Theory, course notes, revised 2017.
 Ralph Freese, "Lattice Theory Homepage".
 

 
Algebraic structures